Anna Pavlovna Surmilina (born 9 August 1998) is a Russian deaf snowboarder. 

She made her Deaflympic debut at the 2015 Winter Deaflympics and claimed two bronze medals in women's snowboarding events.

She also represented Russia at the 2019 Winter Deaflympics and claimed gold medals in women's parallel giant slalom and parallel slalom events.

References 

1998 births
Living people
Russian female snowboarders
Deaf sportspeople
Russian deaf people
Deaflympic gold medalists for Russia
Deaflympic bronze medalists for Russia
Snowboarders at the 2015 Winter Deaflympics
Snowboarders at the 2019 Winter Deaflympics
Medalists at the 2015 Winter Deaflympics
Medalists at the 2019 Winter Deaflympics